Moloto is a South African surname. Notable people with the surname include:

Bakone Justice Moloto (born 1944), South African lawyer and judge
Lebogang Moloto (born 1990), South African soccer player
Sello Moloto (born 1964), South African politician
Trott Moloto (born 1956), South African soccer coach

In South Africa it is also the name of a well-known (and dangerous) regional road, the R573 (Moloto Road) that runs from Pretoria through Siyabuswa on the border of Mpumalanga province.